Paengi-Chigi (kor:팽이치기) is a traditional Korean game enjoyed by both the both young and the old and is played mainly in the winter. This game involves a top and a stick with a long string. These spin tops are wound up with twine and then let go. Players must keep hitting the spinning top with the string tuck with the stick to make it rotate for a long time.

One of the places to experience a couple of these traditional games is at Namsongol Hanok Village.

MAKING PROCESS 
The material to make the top is a kind of wood that is easy to trim or has a hard and heavy grain, such as paulownia, hackberry, birch, and jujube. In some cases, bricks or roof tiles are used instead of wood, and in recent years, steel such as bearings, are used as a spinning top.

When the ingredients are ready, a cylindrical tree, with a sickle and a saw, is cut into an appropriate size, subsequently, cutting the top into various shapes. Traditionally, the lower part of the top had a cone shape, but after the Japanese colonial period, nails and small iron balls were used instead at the pointed ends to make the top spin well. To decorate the upper part of the top Taegeuk (kor: 태극)patterns with ink or paint were drawn. When shaving the top, the aim is to ensure that the top and bottom, and the left and right are well-balanced. An unbalanced top is liable to fall immediately due to severe shaking of the head; unlike a well-balanced top, that spins in one place for an extended time without shaking.

It is common to turn the top while striking the torso. The upper part of the top is wrapped a few turns with the top of the top (the portion of the string that hits the top) and then pulled out while placing it on the floor to turn the top slowly. A stick used to hit the top with all strength accelerates the top gradually, reaching its peak. This competitive game of spinning tops is called a top fight. There are long spins, long throws, quick returns, bumps, and stews. Long-turning is a method of turning the top for a certain amount of time and then hitting the other top once and then deciding which side is spinning longer. Strike away is a way to win by keeping a top upright on a pre-drawn line and striking the top as hard as possible in response to a signal, going farther than the opponent and turning for a long time. Quick Return is a play method that evaluates who drives the top quickly from the starting point to the other. Bump back is the way to win by spinning the top and hitting an obstacle at a certain point, then returning and turning for a long time. The Janggu top involves winning the long spin by rotating the top for a while and pushing the top alternately against the competitor.

HISTORY 
There is no affirmation as to when this game started in Korea. According to the Japanese Book of the Book of Japan written in 720 (King Seongdeok 19), the game of top was inherited by Japan from Korea. Japanese top was passed down from China through Silla to Japan. Historical records, having Paengi-Chigi in the work of King Sukjong of the Joseon Dynasty, and Hancheongmungam (漢淸文鑑)written in the Joseon Dynasty.

The term Paengi-Chigi derived from the appearance of an object turning Bingbing or Pingping, Bongae, Bangae (Hamgyeongdo), is also known as Pye, Pengdol, Puli, Pengsaeng, and Poae.

The top is a traditional play tool for children to play with a round piece of wood whetted at one end, and the string is wrapped around the body and then rotated while unwinding.

TYPES OF PAENGI-CHIGI 
Paengi (top) spelt Pingi (팽이) before, and the word Pingi appears to be a derivative of Pingping, describing spinning movements. Depending on the region, the top is called Peng (Gyeongsangnam-do), Pingding (Gyeongsangbuk-do), Pengdol (Jeollanam-do), Doraegi (Jeju).

There are several types of Paengi:

 Malpaengi(말팽이): a top resembling corn with a pointed tail;
 Janggupaengi (장고팽이): a top that has pointed tails on both sides;
 Sangsuripaengi (상수리팽이): a top with a pointed rod inserted through an acorn.
 Julpaengi (줄팽이): a top with a narrow groove in the middle and the janggu top is a top made by sharply shaving both the right and top ends to turn toward the side. The whip made by binding the bark of tree roots cut into thin pieces, to a narrow crack at the end of a stick. It can also be of durable cloth, silk thread, twine, or leather.

PLAYING METHODS 
This game can be played by two or more than players or singularly. In a competition, the aim is to keep the top spinning as long as possible, while one participant tries to knock over the other spin top with his own. An ice-covered stretch of a house yard or a neighbourhood alley acts as a venue for the game of Paengi-Chigi. A frozen river, pond or rice paddy are good alternatives as well.   

There are some methods of playing the game such as,

1. Long run:- He spins the top by striking it with all his strength, but when the signal goes off, he stops hitting the top any more. When you do that, the spinning top wins.

2. Hit the top:- After turning the top, it bumps into the opponent's top. The side that falls first loses.

3. Send away:-The winner is the one who hits the top at the starting line and sends it farthest.

4. Come back quickly:-The person who hits the top and goes to the target point and returns the fastest wins.

5. Enduring:- The top that runs for a long time without stopping after hitting a large stone or wall wins.

The principles of the science behind the top 
While hitting the top, it turns at an angle at first, but soon it becomes balanced. When the top is about to stop, hitting it with the top and giving it rotational force makes it spin again. The reason behind the top not falling and rotating is due to the rotational inertia. The power of the spinning top keeps the top balanced.

The top turned by hand, transmits kinetic energy to the top,  causing it to rotate. The kinetic energy of the spinning top is converted into thermal energy by bottom friction. The top revolves longer by minimizing the conversion of the rotating force into heat.

References 

Korean games
Chinese games
Tops
Japanese games